Juan Guillermo Urán Salazar (born January 3, 1983 in Medellín, Antioquia) is a male diver from Colombia, who competed in three consecutive Summer Olympics for his native country, starting in 2000. He claimed two gold medals at the 2008 South American Swimming Championships in São Paulo.

In the Olympic Games of Beijing 2008, he and his teammate Víctor Ortega reached the rank six in the 10m synchronized platform event, the best position ever achieved by a Colombian diver in that particular event so far.

References
 
 

1983 births
Living people
Colombian male divers
Divers at the 2000 Summer Olympics
Divers at the 2004 Summer Olympics
Divers at the 2007 Pan American Games
Divers at the 2008 Summer Olympics
Olympic divers of Colombia
Sportspeople from Medellín
Pan American Games bronze medalists for Colombia
Pan American Games medalists in diving
Central American and Caribbean Games silver medalists for Colombia
Central American and Caribbean Games bronze medalists for Colombia
Divers at the 2003 Pan American Games
South American Games gold medalists for Colombia
South American Games medalists in diving
Competitors at the 2010 South American Games
Competitors at the 2006 Central American and Caribbean Games
Central American and Caribbean Games medalists in diving
Medalists at the 2007 Pan American Games
20th-century Colombian people
21st-century Colombian people